Limatulichthys griseus, is a species of catfish in the family Loricariidae.

This species is native to Brazil, Colombia, Ecuador, Guyana and Peru where it is widely distributed in the Amazon basin and in the Essequibo River drainage. It is also known from the Tocantins, western Orinoco, and Parnaíba River basins. L. griseus is a sand dweller.

L. griseus reaches a length of  SL. As with closely related genera, males show a hypertrophied development of the lips suggesting that this species is a lip brooder.

References

Loricariini

Freshwater fish of Brazil
Freshwater fish of Colombia
Freshwater fish of Ecuador
Fish of Guyana
Freshwater fish of Peru
Fish of the Amazon basin
Fish described in 1909
Taxa named by Carl H. Eigenmann